The 1874 Rutgers Queensmen football team represented Rutgers University in the 1874 college football season. The Queensmen compiled a 1–3 record and were outscored by their opponents 17 to 7. The team had no coach, and its captain was Abram T. Marine.

Schedule

References

Rutgers
Rutgers Scarlet Knights football seasons
Rutgers Queensmen football